Billboard Top Rock'n'Roll Hits: 1960 is a compilation album released by Rhino Records in 1988, featuring ten hit recordings from 1960.

One song included on this disc, The Twist by Chubby Checker, is not an original Cameo/Parkway recording but a late 60's re-recording. The reason was because Cameo/Parkway's collection of songs was not able to be licensed for release on CD at that time. Rhino, therefore could not include the original recording. It is a rare instance that Rhino would substitute an original recording for a newer recording.

Three versions of this volume in the "Billboard Top Hits" series were released. The original version was released in 1988 and included two appearances by Elvis Presley: "It's Now or Never" and "Stuck on You."  In 1993, the album was re-released and replaced the two Elvis songs with Joe Jones' "You Talk Too Much" and Brenda Lee's "Sweet Nothin's." The album was again reissued in 1997 and the Presley songs were replaced with another two songs, "Mister Custer," by Larry Verne and "Poetry in Motion," by Johnny Tillotson.

The track lineup on the original 1988 release includes eight songs that reached the top of the Billboard Hot 100 chart. The two exceptions were "Handy Man" and "Walk, Don't Run." The substitution of the Elvis Presley tracks on the re-release brings that number down to six for the 1993 reissue and seven for the 1997 reissue as "Mister Custer" was the only chart topper out of the four replacement songs.

Track listing
Track information and credits taken from the album's liner notes.

References

1988 compilation albums
Billboard Top Rock'n'Roll Hits albums